SOUD, standing for System of Joint Acquisition of Enemy Data was a computerized intelligence exchange system where information acquired by the intelligence and security agencies from participating Warsaw pact countries was stored.

The intelligence exchange organization was founded in 1977, and its initial goal was to safeguard the USSR from 'foreign threats' during the 1980 Olympics in Moscow. 
Stasi engineers conceived the system using stolen Western technology, and it was operational in 1979. Its main computer was based in Moscow, the input language was Russian and the USSR had control over access to the system. Nevertheless, the Stasi was the foremost contributor of the intelligence exchange system, with around a quarter of the entries submitted, followed only by the KGB. Other members of SOUD were Bulgaria, Hungary, Poland, Czechoslovakia, Mongolia and Cuba. They were later joined by Vietnam.

Because of the boycott of the Summer Olympics of 1980, most of the potential threats did not materialise, but the system remained operational. Its databases include names of agents, zionists, hostile religious organisations, organisations of emigrants, journalists, diplomats, cultural and commercial attachés, representatives of airlines, etc. etc. Information found in Stasi documents reveals that in 1989 more than 11,100 names were collected. Most of them included a personal description, the maiden name of the mother and a sample of the handwriting. A query could be handled in less than four hours time.

Notes

References 

Soviet computer systems
Science and technology in the Soviet Union
Stasi
KGB
Telecommunications equipment of the Cold War
Communications in the Soviet Union
Warsaw Pact